Sailing was contested at the 1994 Asian Games in Kannon Marina, Hiroshima Bay, Hiroshima, Japan from October 4 to October 11.

Medalists

Men

Women

Open

Medal table

Participating nations
A total of 56 athletes from 12 nations competed in sailing at the 1994 Asian Games:

References 
 New Straits Times, October 12, 1994
 Results

External links 
 Olympic Council of Asia

 
1994 Asian Games events
1994
Asian Games
1994 Asian Games